The Surveillante class was a type of sixty-gun frigate of the French Navy, designed in 1823 by Mathurin-François Boucher.

One of the main innovations with respect to previous design was the disappearance of the gangways, which provided a flush deck capable of harbouring a complete second battery. With the standardisation on the 30-pounder calibre for all naval ordnance that occurred in the 1820s, this design allowed for a frigate throwing a 900-pound broadside, thrice the firepower of the 40-gun  that constituted the majority of the frigate forces during the Empire, and comparable to that of a 74-gun.

Builder: Lorient
Begun: 
Launched: 29 September 1825
Completed: 
Fate: deleted 22 August 1844.

Builder: Cherbourg
Begun: 
Launched: 28 June 1828
Completed: 
Fate: renamed Indépendante 9 August 1830, deleted 24 October 1860.

Builder: Cherbourg
Begun: 
Launched: 28 July 1828 
Completed: 
Fate: deleted 20 March 1845.

Builder: Lorient
Begun: 
Launched: 25 August 1828
Completed: 
Fate: wrecked off Bermuda 3 December 1838.

Builder: Cherbourg
Begun: 
Launched: 26 March 1834
Completed: 
Fate: deleted 19 March 1861.

Builder: Lorient
Begun: 
Launched: 6 February 1841
Completed: 
Fate: wrecked 16 February 1855 off Bonifacio.

Builder: Lorient
Begun: 
Launched: 8 March 1841
Completed: 
Fate: deleted 17 August 1869.

Builder: Cherbourg
Begun: 
Launched: 16 September 1841
Completed: 
Fate: deleted 23 October 1883.

Builder: Lorient
Begun: 
Launched: 15 August 1860 
Completed: 
Fate: hulked 23 October 1883

Sources and references

References

Sources 
 

Surveillante
 
Ship classes of the French Navy